Odigha Odigha is a Nigerian educator, environmentalist and activist.  He is the founder of Nigeria NGO Coalition for the Environment. He was awarded the Goldman Environmental Prize in 2003, for his efforts on protection of the rainforests of Cross River State from industrial logging. According to Grist News, he said, "If you fight and run away, you'll live to fight another day. If you die in this struggle, your struggle may not continue." Odigha's focus was on the protection of the Cross River rainforest and on sustainable development for rainforest communities which began since 1994.

As an activist, Odigha pursued a political experience that served him well. He was also part of the Ijagham community of Cross River State. Together with the governor of Cross River State, Donald Duke, Odigha managed to set up the first ever Forestry Commission in Nigeria and obtain a first logging moratorium in 2000.

Early life 
Odigha attended St. Peter's Primary School, Ekpokpa, Ikom Local Government Area between 1968 to 1970 and later St. Mary's Primary School, Agbaragba in the same Local Government Area in 1971. After his primary education, he proceeded to St. Brendan's Secondary School, Iyamoyong in Obubra Local Government Area, Cross River State, from 1972 to 1976.

Education 
He also proceeded to University of Calabar, Cross River State, between 1976 to 1980 where he obtained a B.Sc degree in Mathematics / Statistics in 1980.

He enrolled for an MBA degree at the University of Lagos in 1983.

Odigha is a graduate of the University of Calabar with a Bachelor's degree in Mathematics/Statistics. He also enrolled for an MBA degree at the University of Lagos.

Award and recognition 
2003: Goldman Environmental Prize

See also
Ken Saro-Wiwa

References 

Year of birth missing (living people)
Living people
Nigerian environmentalists
Nigerian educators
Goldman Environmental Prize awardees